Hope is a jazz album by pianist Toshiko Akiyoshi.  It was recorded by Nippon Crown Records in December, 2005 and released in 2006.

Track listing (album)
All songs composed by Toshiko Akiyoshi except as noted:
"Feast in Milano" – 9:47
"Memory – 6:35
"Hiroshima Bushi" – 6:02
"Endless Journey" – 6:46
"After Mr. Teng" – 4:30
"Sweet Lorraine" (Burwell, Parish) – 6:48
"SUMI-E" – 6:40
"Drum Conference 3rd Movement" – 5:59
"Hope" – 3:12

Personnel
Toshiko Akiyoshi – piano
Lewis Nash – drums (Tracks 1, 3, 5, 7, 8)
George Mraz – bass (Tracks 1, 3, 5, 7, 8)

CD Single
A CD single, "Hope (希望)" was also released by Nippon Crown and includes the title track version from the album with two new vocal versions - one in Japanese and one in English - sung by Akiyoshi's daughter, Monday Michiru.  The composition "Hope" is the closing section of Akiyoshi's "Hiroshima: Rising from the Abyss" suite, first introduced on the 2001 Toshiko Akiyoshi Jazz Orchestra album, Hiroshima - Rising From The Abyss.

Track listing (CD single)
"Hope" – 3:37 (Japanese lyrics)
"Hope" – 3:30 (English lyrics)
"Hope" – 3:11 (instrumental version from the 2006 Toshiko Akiyoshi album Hope)

"Hope" composed by Toshiko Akiyoshi, Japanese Lyrics by Shuntarō Tanikawa, vocals and English translation by Monday Michiru.

References / External links
Album
Hope, Nippon Crown Records CRCJ-9160 (link)
Hope at Allmusic.com ([ link])
CD single
Hope (希望) Nippon Crown Records CRCP-10157

Toshiko Akiyoshi albums
2006 albums